Bahlinger SC is a German association football club from the Kaiserstuhl town of Bahlingen, Baden-Württemberg.

History

The club was founded 16 June 1929 as FC Bahlingen and merged with TV Bahlingen in 1946 to form the present-day side. Since the early 1960s BSC has played largely as a fourth tier amateur side. In 1969 the club advanced to third division play where they spent nine seasons until league reorganization saw them placed in the now fourth tier Amateurliga Südbaden. Another reorganization in the early 1990s saw the Amateurliga become a fifth division league.

Bahlinger narrowly missed advancing to the Oberliga Baden-Württemberg (IV) in 1994 and 1995. They took the step up on the strength of a Verbandsliga championship in 1996. The club enjoyed a nine season long turn in the Oberliga where their best result was a fifth-place finish in 1997. A Südbadischer Pokal (South Baden Cup) win in 2002 earned an appearance in the 2003 German Cup where they beat Alemannia Aachen 1:0 in the first round before going out 1:2 to SV Waldhof Mannheim. BSC then slipped to the fifth division in 2005 before returning to the Oberliga Baden-Württemberg for 2006–07 after a single season absence.

The club made an excellent start into the 2011–12 season, defeating FV Illertissen 11–0 in the opening round, eventually finishing eleventh in 2012 and as high as sixth in 2013. In 2014 however the club played closer to the relegation zone, eventually coming 14th. In the 2014–15 season the club finished runners-up in the Oberliga and thereby qualified for the promotion round to the Regionalliga Südwest. After a draw against TSV Lehnerz and a win over SC Hauenstein the club was promoted to the Regionalliga for the first time, but lasted for only one season before being relegated again. By winning the 2018-19 season of the Oberliga, the club returned to Regionalliga.

Honours

League
 Oberliga Baden-Württemberg
 Champions: 2019
 Runners-up: 2015
Verbandsliga Südbaden
 Champions: 1996
 Runners-up: 1994, 1995, 2006

Cup
South Baden Cup
 Winners: 2002, 2013, 2015
DFB Cup
 Participant: 2002, 2013, 2015

Recent managers
Recent managers of the club:

Recent seasons
The recent season-by-season performance of the club:

 With the introduction of the Regionalligas in 1994 and the 3. Liga in 2008 as the new third tier, below the 2. Bundesliga, all leagues below dropped one tier.

Key

Stadium
Bahlinger SC plays its home matches in the Kaiserstuhlstadion (capacity 5,000).

References

External links
Official team site
Abseits Guide to German Soccer
Bahlinger SC at Weltfussball.de

Football clubs in Germany
Football clubs in Baden-Württemberg
Association football clubs established in 1929
1929 establishments in Germany